The 1998–99 season of the Venezuelan Primera División, the top category of Venezuelan football, was played by 12 teams. The national champions were Deportivo Italchacao.

Torneo Apertura

Torneo Clausura

Final Playoff

External links
Venezuela 1999 season at RSSSF

Venezuelan Primera División seasons
Ven
Ven
1998–99 in Venezuelan football